The Electric Motive Power was an English electric car manufactured in 1897.  A heavy phaeton, it was capable of running  on one charge.

See also
 List of car manufacturers of the United Kingdom

References

Vehicles introduced in 1897
1890s cars
Electric vehicles introduced in the 20th century
Defunct motor vehicle manufacturers of the United Kingdom